David Edward Coote (born 8 April 1955) is a former English cricketer.  Coote was a left-handed batsman.  He was born at Winkburn, Nottinghamshire.

Career
Coote made a single first-class appearance for Nottinghamshire against Yorkshire at Trent Bridge in the 1977 County Championship.  In a match which Yorkshire won by 5 wickets, he batted once, scoring 20 runs in Nottinghamshire's first-innings, before being dismissed by Phil Carrick.  In that same season he also made a single List A appearance against Gloucestershire in the John Player League at Trent Bridge.  He scored 13 runs in Nottinghamshire's innings, before being dismissed by Mike Procter, with Gloucestershire winning the match by 13 runs.  He continued to appear for the Nottinghamshire Second XI after 1977, playing Second XI cricket until 1982.  Coote played club cricket in the Nottinghamshire Premier League for Collingham until 2005.

Personal life
Coote is the father of football referee David Coote.

References

External links
David Coote at ESPNcricinfo
David Coote at CricketArchive

1955 births
Living people
People from Newark and Sherwood (district)
Cricketers from Nottinghamshire
English cricketers
Nottinghamshire cricketers